The Surprise Recreation Campus is an athletic facility based in Surprise, Arizona.  It features such amenities as Surprise Stadium (spring training home of Major League Baseball's Kansas City Royals and Texas Rangers), 12 baseball fields (6 lighted), and an  multipurpose field (lighted).  The facility at one time played host to an independent professional baseball team, the Golden Baseball League's Surprise Fightin' Falcons and currently host a minor league baseball team, the Surprise Rafters of the Arizona Fall League.

References

Reference links
 Surprise, Arizona official website

Sports in Surprise, Arizona
Sports venues in Maricopa County, Arizona